Cagatay Kader (born 25 February 1997) is a German footballer who plays as a forward for Borussia Mönchengladbach II.

He has been a youth international for Germany, earning caps for the U18 and U20 team.

References

External links
 
 

1997 births
Living people
German people of Turkish descent
German footballers
Association football forwards
Germany youth international footballers
Footballers from Düsseldorf
3. Liga players
Regionalliga players
VfL Bochum II players
VfL Bochum players
FSV Frankfurt players
VfR Aalen players
1922 Konyaspor footballers
VfB Homberg players
SV 19 Straelen players
Borussia Mönchengladbach II players
21st-century German people